The 2022 Supercoppa Italiana (branded as the EA Sports Supercup for sponsorship reasons) was the 35th edition of the Supercoppa Italiana, the Italian football super cup. It was a Derby della Madonnina meeting between Milan, winners of the 2021–22 Serie A championship, and Internazionale, winners of the 2021–22 Coppa Italia. It took place at the King Fahd International Stadium in Riyadh, Saudi Arabia.

Internazionale won the match 3–0 for their second consecutive and seventh overall Supercoppa Italiana title.

Background
This was the second time Milan and Internazionale had met in the Supercoppa Italiana, with Milan winning the 2011 edition 2–1 in Beijing, China. It ended Juventus' streak of ten consecutive appearances which started the following year. Milan entered the game having won seven of eleven Supercoppa games, and first since losing to Juventus in 2018. Internazionale made its second successive appearance, having beaten Juventus the previous year, and entered the game having won six of ten.

Match

Details

See also
 2021–22 Serie A
 2021–22 Coppa Italia

Notes

References

2022
A.C. Milan matches
Inter Milan matches
2022–23 in Italian football cups
Sports competitions in Saudi Arabia
January 2023 sports events in Saudi Arabia